The 2016–17 MDFA Elite Division is the 104th season of the MDFA Elite Division, the top-tier football league in Mumbai, a city in the Indian state of Maharashtra.

Teams

Table

Result

Top scorers
5 goals
  Rishikesh Shinde (Central Bank of India)

4 goals

  Steven Dias (Mumbai)

3 goals

  Karan Sawhney (Mumbai)

2 goals

  Fahim Faki (Central Bank of India)

1 goal

  Michael Idewele (Union Bank of India)
  Ravi Sonune (Central Bank of India)
  Scott D'Souza (Central Bank of India)
  Anuraj Sidhu (Air India
  Sunny Thakur (Air India
  John Coutinho (Mumbai Customs)
  Satyam Sharma (ONGC)
  Nitesh Monde (ONGC)
  Dharmesh Patel (ONGC)
  V Lalchhuanawma (ONGC)
  Shilton D'Silva (Mumbai)
  Charles Miranda (Mumbai Customs)
  Rinaldo Fernandes (Mumbai Customs)
  Sagar (Mumbai Customs)
  Saheb Singh (Western Railways)
  Ravikant Naidu (Western Railways)
  Tejas Raut (PIFA)

References

MDFA Elite Division
2016–17 in Indian football leagues